Baranavichy Oblast was a territorial unit in the Belarusian Soviet Socialist Republic created after the annexation of West Belarus into the BSSR in November 1939. The administrative centre of the province was the city of Baranavichy.

The voblast was originally known as the Navahrudak Voblast but it was soon renamed to Baranavichy Voblast.

The oblast was made up of 26 raions in 1944. These raions were Byten, Gorodyshche, Ivyanets, Iwye, Yuratishki, Karelichy, Kletsk, Kozlovshchina, Lyakhavichy, Lida, Lubcha, Mir, Masty, Navahrudak, Nova Mysh, Nesvizh, Radun, Slonim, Stowbtsy, Shchuchyn, Vasilishki, Valozhyn, Voranava, Dzyatlava, Zel’va and Zheludok. In 1944, the oblast was diminished after transferring raions of Lida, Radun, Schuchyn, Vasilishki, Voranava, Masty, Zel’va and Zheludok to newly founded Hrodna Voblast (Founded after remaining parts of Belastok Region to Belarus in 1945) and ones of Iwye, Yuratishki and Valozhyn to Molodechno Voblast in 1944. Finally, on January 8, 1954, the oblast was liquidated and the raions were divided between the Brest (Raions of Gorodyshche, Lyakhavichy and Novo Mysh), Grodno (Byten, Karelichi, Kozlovshchina, Lubcha, Mir, Navahrudak and Slonim), Molodechno (liquidated in 1960) (Raion of Ivyanets) and Minsk (Raions of Kletsk, Nesvizh and Stowbtsy) Olbasts (Modern Brest Voblast, Hrodna Voblast and Minsk Voblast). Thus, Baranavichy became part of Brest one as raion center after Nova Mysh one's center was moved to Baranavichy on 1 May 1954 and renaming it as Baranavichy one after 8 April 1957.

References

External links
Administrative division of Belarus: a historical information

Former subdivisions of Belarus
States and territories established in 1939